"Make Me Feel Better" is a song recorded by English record producer and DJ Alex Adair. It was released as a single on 1 March 2015 by Spinnin' Records. It samples vocals from "Ain't Nothing Like the Real Thing" by Marvin Gaye and Tammi Terrell.

Music video
The music video for "Make Me Feel Better" premiered on 20 December 2014. The video was filmed in Los Angeles. It shows three older girls dancing in front of a backdrop with settings in the backdrop changing as they continue to dance. As of October 2017, the video has received over 13 million views on YouTube.

Track listings
Digital download
"Make Me Feel Better" – 4:55

Digital download (Radio Edit)
"Make Me Feel Better" (Radio Edit) – 3:17

Remixes
"Make Me Feel Better" (Klingande Remix) – 4:25
"Make Me Feel Better" (Don Diablo & CID Remix) – 3:22
"Make Me Feel Better" (Illyus & Barrientos Remix) – 6:03
"Make Me Feel Better" (Russ Chimes Remix) – 6:59
"Make Me Feel Better" (S.P.Y Remix) – 5:18

Charts

Certifications

References

2015 singles
2015 songs
Spinnin' Records singles
Songs written by Nickolas Ashford
Songs written by Valerie Simpson
Tropical house songs
Songs written by Klingande